GFF may refer to:

Entertainment 
 Girlfriends Films, an American pornographic studio
 Glasgow Film Festival, in Scotland
 Gothenburg Film Festival, in Sweden

Sports 
 Gabonese Football Federation
 Gambia Football Federation
 Georgian Football Federation
 Göteborgs FF, Swedish football club
 Gothenburg Football Association
 Guinean Football Federation
 Guyana Football Federation

Other uses 
 GFF (journal), a geology journal
 General feature format, a file format used for describing genes
 Göteborgs FyrverkeriFabrik, a Swedish fireworks company
 Griffith Airport, in New South Wales, Australia
 Griffith railway station, in New South Wales, Australia
 Guild of Fine Food, a British family-owned company